Narpatganj is a neighbourhood in Narpatganj, Bihar, India.

Narpatganj may also refer to:
 Narpatganj town
 Narpatganj (community development block)
 Narpatganj (Vidhan Sabha constituency)